Beautiful Mess may refer to:

 "Beautiful Mess" (Diamond Rio song), by Diamond Rio
 "Beautiful Mess" (Kristian Kostov song), Bulgarian entry in the Eurovision Song Contest 2017
 Beautiful Mess (Jeff Scott Soto album)
 Beautiful Mess (Swing Out Sister album)
 Beautiful Mess (Thelonious Monster album)